Czarna Białostocka  is a town in north-eastern Poland. It is the seat of Gmina Czarna Białostocka, situated in Białystok County in the Podlaskie Voivodeship, having previously been in Białystok Voivodeship (1975-1998). As of December 2021, the town has a population of 9,032.

Notable people
Andrzej Jerzy Zglejszewski (born 1961) Catholic bishop in the United States.

References

Cities and towns in Podlaskie Voivodeship
Białystok County
Trakai Voivodeship
Sokolsky Uyezd
Białystok Voivodeship (1919–1939)
Belastok Region